is a 2015 Japanese film directed by Katsuyuki Motohiro and featuring the members of Japanese idol girl group Momoiro Clover Z. It's based on a play of the same name by Oriza Hirata (ja). It was released on February 28, 2015.

Cast
Kanako Momota
Shiori Tamai
Ayaka Sasaki
Momoka Ariyasu
Reni Takagi
Haru Kuroki
Tsuyoshi Muro

Music
The theme song of the film is "Seishunfu" by Momoiro Clover Z.

Reception
As of March 1, 2015, the film had earned  at the Japanese box office.

References

External links

2015 films
Japanese films based on plays
Films directed by Katsuyuki Motohiro
Momoiro Clover Z
2010s Japanese films